Ribe is a town in south-west Jutland, Denmark, with a population of 8,257 (2022). It is the seat of the Diocese of Ribe covering southwestern Jutland. Until 1 January 2007, Ribe was the seat of both a surrounding municipality and county. It is now part of the enlarged Esbjerg Municipality in the Region of Southern Denmark. It has been called the oldest town in Denmark.

History

The town was a center of commercial activity in the early 8th century, and this may have originated with royal influence. Coins may have been struck there in 720. Whichever king was involved in the digging of the Kanhave Canal may have been involved in the establishment of Ribe also. Trade contacts were mostly with Frisia and England. Of the over 300 sceatas found in Denmark, 216 come from in or around Ribe, most of them the Wodan type, and these were likely minted in Ribe in the early eighth century. The Ancient Diocese of Ribe was established in 948 with the consecration of Leofdag of Ribe as its first bishop.

Early in the ninth century a 2-meter wide ditch (a demarcation rather than a fortification) was dug around the town, enclosing a 12-hectare area. Later that century the ditch was replaced by a moat, 6 to 7 meters wide. Archeological evidence shows Ribe was "an active and impressive market place" in the eighth and ninth centuries, and again at the end of the eleventh century, but there is little evidence from the period in between; the town may have dwindled or even disappeared.

When archbishop Ansgar set out to christianize Scandinavia, he requested (in about 860) of King Horik II of Denmark that the first Scandinavian church be built in Ribe, which at the time was one of the most important trade cities in Scandinavia. However, the presence in Ribe of a bishop, and thus a cathedral, can only be confirmed from the year 948. Recent archaeological excavations in Ribe, however, have led to the discovery of between 2,000 and 3,000 Christian graves. They have been dated to the ninth century, indicating that a large Christian community was already living peacefully together with the Vikings at the time. Excavations conducted between 2008 and 2012 have also revealed more details of the original church built by Ansgar.

Construction on the Ribe Cathedral started in 1150, on top of an earlier church, most probably Ansgar's church, built in 860. The Treaty of Ribe was proclaimed in 1460. In October 1634 a storm tide flooded the city.

The Catholic diocese was dissolved in 1536 during the Reformation; it was succeeded by the Diocese of Ribe, governed by the newly established protestant Church of Denmark.

On 1 January 2007, the Municipality of Ribe ceased to exist as it merged with the municipalities of Esbjerg and Bramming, now forming the new municipality of Esbjerg.

Notable buildings
Ribe Cathedral
Ribe Kunstmuseum

Notable people

The arts 
 Anders Bording (1619–1677), poet
 Kristen Feilberg (1839 in Vester Vedsted – 1919), photographer of the peoples and landscapes of Sumatra and Singapore
 Jacob Riis (1849–1914), an American immigrant photographer, wrote How the Other Half Lives
 Bodil Hauschildt (1861–1951), photographer
 J. Bodewalt Lampe (1869–1929), American composer, arranger, performer
 Jens Olsen (1872–1945), a clockmaker and locksmith
 Astrid Noack (1888–1954), a Danish sculptor 
 Rued Langgaard (1893–1952) a late-Romantic composer and organist at Ribe Cathedral
 Kjeld Abell (1901–1961), playwright, screenwriter and theatrical designer
 Børge Ring (1921–2018), animated short film writer, director and animator
 Annemette Kure Andersen (born 1969), poet and literary editor
Per Vers (born 1976), rapper

Politicians, clergy, and officials
 Valdemar II of Denmark (1170–1241), King of Denmark
 Hans Tausen (1494–1561), leader of the Reformation in Denmark,  Bishop of Ribe 1542–1562.
 Peder Palladius (1503–1560), theologian, priest and bishop
 Maren Spliid (c.1600–1641), victim of the persecution of witches
 Hans Schack, 2nd Count of Schackenborg (1676 in Ribe – 1719), nobleman
 Hans Adolf Brorson (1694–1764), Danish Pietist clergyman and hymn writer
 Friderich Christian Hager (1756–1795), colonial commander and governor of the Danish Gold Coast
 Elisabeth Dons Christensen (born 1944), theologian, bishop of the Diocese of Ribe 2003–2014
 Holger K. Nielsen (born 1950), former leader of the Socialist People's Party

Science and business 
 Vibeke Jensdatter (1638–1709), merchant
 Emil Christian Hansen (1842–1909), brewmaster and mycologist
 Cathrine Horsbøl (1872–1947), furniture designer
 Jens Rasmussen (1926–2018), professor
 Erik Hansen  (1927–2016), architect
 Stefan Sahl (1976–present), Copywriter

Sport 
 John Lauridsen (born 1959), footballer 
 Martin Rauschenberg (born 1992), footballer
 Mikael Uhre (born 1994), footballer

Education

The town of Ribe has a long history as a center of learning. The cathedral school (Ribe Katedralskole) has its roots in the Latin School of Ribe, dating back to at least 1145, when the bishop officially handed over the chapter's school. The school provided religious education of priests and clergymen up until 1805 and is nowadays a gymnasium (Danish high school). Ribe Katedralskole celebrated its 850th anniversary in 1995, and is the oldest continuously existing school in Scandinavia.

Schools
 Ribe Katedralskole
 The State College of Education in Ribe (Teacher Training College), part of the University College of West Jutland
 Ribe Business College
 VUC (Adult Education Center)

Demographics
The following table shows the population of Ribe. Data from before the 18th century are estimates, the rest are taken from the official census.

Twin cities and towns

See also
 Dankirke

References

Sources
 The New Cambridge Medieval History. Cambridge University Press, 1995. .
  s:Catholic Encyclopedia (1913)/Ancient See of Ribe in Denmark (Jutland)

External links

 Official Tourism website

 
700s establishments
Populated places established in the 8th century
Cities and towns in the Region of Southern Denmark
Viking Age populated places
Esbjerg Municipality
8th-century establishments in Europe